The  is an annual award for manga series presented by Kadokawa Corporation's Da Vinci magazine and Niconico streaming website. It is divided into two categories: one for print manga, and one for web manga.

Overview
The award was originally established on October 6, 2014, as a collaboration between Kadokawa Corporation's Da Vinci magazine and its Niconico streaming website. The award is divided into two categories, the first is for manga that have been published in print publications, and the second for series published online. In order for a series to be eligible, it must be currently serializing and have no more than five volumes published or have started serialization after January 1. The final decision is made by having fans vote. Until 2021, voting was restricted to Japan. However, in 2021 an English website was launched.

Recipients

References

External links
 Official website 

2014 establishments in Japan
Annual events in Japan
Awards established in 2014
Manga awards